Romain Gall (born January 31, 1995) is an American professional soccer player who plays for Malmö FF.

Youth
Gall was born in Paris, France, to a French father and a Senegalese mother. Gall moved to the United States with his family at the age of seven. The family settled in Herndon, Virginia, and Gall received his U.S. citizenship at fifteen.

Gall played for the academy teams of D.C. United and Real Salt Lake before joining the academy of FC Lorient in 2011. Ranked as the #2 recruit in his class, he committed to playing college soccer for the University of Maryland, but instead opted to play with the reserves at Lorient.

Club career
Gall signed with Major League Soccer in August 2014 and was allocated to the Columbus Crew via a weighted lottery. He made his professional debut in a 3–0 victory over the Houston Dynamo on August 23. He was loaned to the Austin Aztex in the United Soccer League, wearing the number 9. Gall was waived by Columbus in February 2016.

On March 31, 2016, Gall joined Nyköpings BIS in the Tier 3 Division 1 Norra  in Sweden. After one season in Nyköping, Gall caught the eye of Allsvenskan club GIF Sundsvall, who signed him to a three-year contract. Gall made 24 league appearances in his first season with Sundsvall. After a breakout performance in the spring of 2018, where he scored 7 goals in 13 appearances from a midfield position, Gall secured a move to Allsvenskan powerhouse Malmö FF halfway through the season.

International career
Gall was called up to the United States men's national soccer team on November 6, 2018 for friendly matches against England and Italy. Gall made his international debut for the United States against Italy in a 0–1 loss on November 20, 2018, coming on as a replacement for Christian Pulisic in the 83rd minute.

Personal life
A fan of hip hop and R&B, in his free time Gall enjoys making music on his computer.

Career statistics

Club

International

Honours 
Malmö FF

 Svenska Cupen: 2021–22

References

External links

1995 births
Living people
Footballers from Paris
American soccer players
United States men's international soccer players
United States men's youth international soccer players
United States men's under-20 international soccer players
French footballers
French emigrants to the United States
American people of Senegalese descent
American sportspeople of African descent
Sportspeople of Senegalese descent
American people of French descent
French sportspeople of Senegalese descent
Columbus Crew players
Austin Aztex players
GIF Sundsvall players
Malmö FF players
Association football midfielders
Championnat National 2 players
Championnat National 3 players
Major League Soccer players
USL Championship players
Allsvenskan players
Ettan Fotboll players
American expatriate soccer players
Expatriate footballers in Sweden
2015 CONCACAF U-20 Championship players